Rostov State Medical University (Ростовский Государственный Медицинский Университет in Russian) is a Russian public university of higher professional education and ministry on health and social medicine. Rostov State Medical University is also known as Rostov State Medical Institute, RostSMU, RostGMU, Rostov State Government Medical University.

History

In 1915, the Division of Medicine at the Russian Warsaw University was moved to Rostov on Don and that gave rise to the present-day Rostov State Medical University. It was initially formed as a department and later transformed into a medical Institute in 1930. In 1994, the Rostov Medical Institute which is the largest basic training, research, and treatment center in southern Russia was renamed the Rostov Medical University.

Description
In college annually trains over 5000 students and 7000 students - the faculty training and professional retraining of specialists, each year more than 650 people trained in the internship, residency, the graduate school. 

In 2008, RostSMU Medical established a military training center for students training contract to contract service in the Armed Forces of Russia in the officers' positions after graduation.

The University operates 91 departments, which employ over 800 people teaching staff, of whom more than 130 doctors, professors, about 500 candidates. The university engaged in research and clinical activities, and 3 1 academician, corresponding member of Russian Academy of Medical Sciences. 

The University celebrated its 75 anniversary in 2005.

The main directions of the scientific-investigation activity of the University are:

Studying of the pathogenesis, diagnostic criteria and effectivity of the treatment HIV infections;
The pathogenesis, diagnostics, treatment, and prophylaxis of the heart-vascular diseases
Development and introduction of the methods of X-ray diagnostics and radiation therapy;
Studying the pathogenesis mechanisms and developing the treatment methods of the ulcerative disease;
Treatment methods in acute surgical diseases of the thorax, abdominal and pelvic cavities, methods of endoscopic surgery;
Development and improvement of the methods of the prophylaxis, diagnosis, and treatment of urological diseases;
Development and introduction of the methods of diagnostics and early revelation of tuberculosis;
Ethiopathogenesis, diagnostics, and treatment of the blood system diseases;
Reconstructive surgical procedures for the treatment of posttraumatic patients;
Diagnostics, treatment, and rehabilitation of the patients with mental illnesses, development of the measures for urgent psychiatric and medico-psychological help in social stress and extreme situations.

Science and activities
Scientific activities increased and coordinated through the research of implemented and on faculties and courses. The University is functioning effectively in the central research laboratory (CSRL), conducting a wide range of biochemical, molecular genetic, morphological, microbiological studies. State educational institution of higher education "Rostov State Medical University, Federal Agency for Health and Social Development" promotes international scientific cooperation with Britain, the US, Germany, France, Bulgaria, Ukraine, Armenia, Moldova, and other foreign countries by exchanging researchers and students, teachers, qualified specialists, taking part in international scientific conferences, congresses.

The international scientific cooperation is carried out with scientific and medical establishments, with large foreign high schools: the High Medical Institute of Pleven (Bulgaria), Medical Faculty of Glasgow University (Great Britain), Medical Faculty of Southern Alabama Mobil University (USA), Universities of Rochester and Illinois (USA), the Dutch Centre of Science on application and introduction of information methods of treatment, Institute of AIDS of the Harward University (USA), Medical Faculty of the Cologne University (Germany).

Clinics and faculties
Medical University Clinic

The clinic has 860 beds at the hospital, including 20 specialized departments, 18 medical-diagnostic units, 17 clinical departments, whose employees carry significant medical, counseling, and teaching work.

Rostov State Medical University - is

- Preparation of domestic and foreign nationals in the field:

Faculty of General Medicine;
Faculty of Dentistry;
Faculty of Pediatrics;
Faculty of Pharmacy;
Faculty of Medico-prophylactics;
Faculty of Postgraduate and Continuous Education;
Faculty of Armed Force Medicine;
Preparatory Faculty;

The University has collaborated with the World Federation for Medical Education, the World Health Organization, UNESCO, the British Council, the United States Agency for International Development, the American International Health Alliance, and participating in a range of joint international research projects.

Accreditation and recognition 
The university has gained recognition from some of the top international organizations including;

 World Health Organization (WHO);
 Medical Council of India (MCI);
 Nursing and Midwifery Council (NMC);
 And, General Medical Council (GMC).

Administration

Rector: Shlyk Sergei Vladimirovich - Rector of the Rostov State Medical University, Doctor of Medical Sciences, Professor

Vice-Сhancellor on Educational Work:
Natalia Viktorovna Drobotya
Doc.Med.Sci., Professor

Vice-Chancellor on Training Foreign Citizens and International Cooperation:
Gafiyatullina Gyuzyal Shamilevna
Doc.Med.Sci., Professor

Vice-Сhancellor on Scientific Research:
Volkova Natalia Ivanovna
Doc.Med.Sci., Professor

Vice-Сhancellor on Social and Educational Work:
Elena Viktorovna Chaplygina
Doc.Med.Sci., Professor

Vice-Сhancellor on Regional Development:
Cherkasov Mikhail Fedorovich
Doc.Med.Sci., Professor

Vice-Сhancellor on Postgraduate Education:
Brizhak Zinaida Igorevna
Doc.Psych.Sci.

Students' Scientific Society
Students' Scientific Society (SSS), an organization with a 70-second story, unites students are actively engaged in research work in the departments, laboratories and other units of the university, students and applicants applying for admission to RostGMU, as well as students of medical colleges, scientific collection Student clubs departments of the university. After the liberation of the Don land from the Nazi invaders of the Kuibyshev Medical Institute returned to Rostov. In December 1943, classes began. Resumed work in 16 scientific circles.

Representative of RostSMU, Russia
Official representative of International students

Notable alumni
Galina Shatalova - neurosurgeon, military surgeon, head of the cosmonaut selection and training department, laureate of the Burdenko Prize (1951).

References

Dr.Md.Enamul Hasan(MABS)

External links
   
 Website for International students

 
Educational institutions established in 1915
Medical schools in Russia
Universities in Rostov-on-Don
1915 establishments in the Russian Empire